WoodSpring Suites is a hotel brand owned by Choice Hotels. It was founded in July 2015. As of June 30, 2020, there are 281 hotels with 33,797 rooms in the chain.

The hotel chain was founded as Value Place in 2003 by Jack DeBoer.

In April 2015, the brand changed its name from Value Place to WoodSpring Suites in order to have better perception.

In December 2017, Woodsprings Suites was sold to Choice Hotels for approximately $230 million.

References

Hotels established in 2003
Hotel chains in the United States
Choice Hotels brands